Shuwa (Shoobo), or Pianga (Pyaang), once considered a dialect of Bushong, is a Bantu language of Kasai-Oriental Province, Democratic Republic of the Congo.

References

Tetela languages